Xhafer Deva's house is a building with great architectural and cultural values which is situated in the city of Mitrovica, Kosovo.

Xhafer Deva's house was built in 1930 by Austrian architects and workers. It is a beautiful building. It was owned by Xhafer Deva, the Albanian Minister of Internal Affairs in 1943 and 1944. The building is slowly becoming a ruin; some poor families live there at risk to their lives and where other people throw their garbage.

Even though it has been declared a cultural monument and despite its architectural and historical value, no one has cared for it. It was once the pride of Mitrovica. Representatives of the cultural heritage center in Mitrovica plan to restore the building at a cost of about 150,000 euros, after which the cultural heritage center of Mitrovica will be based there, some rooms will turn to a museum for Xhafer Deva and his family, and the municipality will have rooms to host international guests.

See also
 Monuments in Mitrovica
 Xhafer Deva

References

Monuments and memorials in Kosovo
Residential buildings in Kosovo
District of Mitrovica
Cultural heritage monuments in Mitrovica, Kosovo